Sciadonus is a genus of blind cusk eels.

The generic name is derived from Greek σκίαινα (skíaina, “sea-fish, red mullet") and ὄνος (onos, "hake").

Species
There are currently four recognized species in this genus:
 Sciadonus cryptophthalmus (Zugmayer, 1911)
 Sciadonus galatheae (J. G. Nielsen, 1969)
 Sciadonus jonassoni (Nybelin, 1957)
 Sciadonus pedicellaris Garman, 1899

References

Aphyonidae